Mulshi is a village and an administrative block in Pune district. There is also an informal bus stop with access to Pune. The region is an eco-tourism hotspot, and outside the town there are many guest houses and gardens. The administrative offices are in Paud village where as industrialization to some extent has taken place in Pirangut and nearby villages. Pune's much talked of IT park is also in Mulshi Taluka. It is one of the popular places to visit near Pune, specially during monsoon.

References 

Villages in Pune district